Thoralf Albert Skolem (23 May 1887 – 23 March 1963) was a Norwegian mathematician who worked in mathematical logic and set theory.

Life 
Although Skolem's father was a primary school teacher, most of his extended family were farmers. Skolem attended secondary school in Kristiania (later renamed Oslo), passing the university entrance examinations in 1905. He then entered Det Kongelige Frederiks Universitet to study mathematics, also taking courses in physics, chemistry, zoology and botany.

In 1909, he began working as an assistant to the physicist Kristian Birkeland, known for bombarding magnetized spheres with electrons and obtaining aurora-like effects; thus Skolem's first publications were physics papers written jointly with Birkeland. In 1913, Skolem passed the state examinations with distinction, and completed a dissertation titled Investigations on the Algebra of Logic. He also traveled with Birkeland to the Sudan to observe the zodiacal light. He spent the winter semester of 1915 at the University of Göttingen, at the time the leading research center in mathematical logic, metamathematics, and abstract algebra, fields in which Skolem eventually excelled. In 1916 he was appointed a research fellow at Det Kongelige Frederiks Universitet. In 1918, he became a Docent in Mathematics and was elected to the Norwegian Academy of Science and Letters.

Skolem did not at first formally enroll as a Ph.D. candidate, believing that the Ph.D. was unnecessary in Norway. He later changed his mind and submitted a thesis in 1926, titled Some theorems about integral solutions to certain algebraic equations and inequalities. His notional thesis advisor was Axel Thue, even though Thue had died in 1922.

In 1927, he married Edith Wilhelmine Hasvold.

Skolem continued to teach at Det kongelige Frederiks Universitet (renamed the University of Oslo in 1939) until 1930 when he became a Research Associate in Chr. Michelsen Institute in Bergen. This senior post allowed Skolem to conduct research free of administrative and teaching duties. However, the position also required that he reside in Bergen, a city which then lacked a university and hence had no research library, so that he was unable to keep abreast of the mathematical literature. In 1938, he returned to Oslo to assume the Professorship of Mathematics at the university. There he taught the graduate courses in algebra and number theory, and only occasionally on mathematical logic. Skolem's Ph.D. student Øystein Ore went on to a career in the USA.

Skolem served as president of the Norwegian Mathematical Society, and edited the Norsk Matematisk Tidsskrift ("The Norwegian Mathematical Journal") for many years. He was also the founding editor of Mathematica Scandinavica.

After his 1957 retirement, he made several trips to the United States, speaking and teaching at universities there. He remained intellectually active until his sudden and unexpected death.

For more on Skolem's academic life, see Fenstad (1970).

Mathematics 
Skolem published around 180 papers on Diophantine equations, group theory, lattice theory, and most of all, set theory and mathematical logic. He mostly published in Norwegian journals with limited international circulation, so that his results were occasionally rediscovered by others. An example is the Skolem–Noether theorem, characterizing the automorphisms of simple algebras. Skolem published a proof in 1927, but Emmy Noether independently rediscovered it a few years later.

Skolem was among the first to write on lattices. In 1912, he was the first to describe a free distributive lattice generated by n elements. In 1919, he showed that every implicative lattice (now also called a Skolem lattice) is distributive and, as a partial converse, that every finite distributive lattice is implicative. After these results were rediscovered by others, Skolem published a 1936 paper in German, "Über gewisse 'Verbände' oder 'Lattices'", surveying his earlier work in lattice theory.

Skolem was a pioneer model theorist. In 1920, he greatly simplified the proof of a theorem Leopold Löwenheim first proved in 1915, resulting in the Löwenheim–Skolem theorem, which states that if a countable first-order theory has an infinite model, then it has a countable model. His 1920 proof employed the axiom of choice, but he later (1922 and 1928) gave proofs using Kőnig's lemma in place of that axiom. It is notable that Skolem, like Löwenheim, wrote on mathematical logic and set theory employing the notation of his fellow pioneering model theorists Charles Sanders Peirce and Ernst Schröder, including Π, Σ as variable-binding quantifiers, in contrast to the notations of Peano, Principia Mathematica, and Principles of Mathematical Logic. Skolem (1934) pioneered the construction of non-standard models of arithmetic and set theory.

Skolem (1922) refined Zermelo's axioms for set theory by replacing Zermelo's vague notion of a "definite" property with any property that can be coded in first-order logic. The resulting axiom is now part of the standard axioms of set theory. Skolem also pointed out that a consequence of the Löwenheim–Skolem theorem is what is now known as Skolem's paradox: If Zermelo's axioms are consistent, then they must be satisfiable within a countable domain, even though they prove the existence of uncountable sets.

Completeness 
The completeness of first-order logic is a corollary of results Skolem proved in the early 1920s and discussed in Skolem (1928), but he failed to note this fact, perhaps because mathematicians and logicians did not become fully aware of completeness as a fundamental metamathematical problem until the 1928 first edition of Hilbert and Ackermann's Principles of Mathematical Logic clearly articulated it. In any event, Kurt Gödel first proved this completeness in 1930.

Skolem distrusted the completed infinite and was one of the founders of finitism in mathematics. Skolem (1923) sets out his primitive recursive arithmetic, a very early contribution to the theory of computable functions, as a means of avoiding the so-called paradoxes of the infinite. Here he developed the arithmetic of the natural numbers by first defining objects by primitive recursion, then devising another system to prove properties of the objects defined by the first system. These two systems enabled him to define prime numbers and to set out a considerable amount of number theory. If the first of these systems can be considered as a programming language for defining objects, and the second as a programming logic for proving properties about the objects, Skolem can be seen as an unwitting pioneer of theoretical computer science.

In 1929, Presburger proved that Peano arithmetic without multiplication was consistent, complete, and decidable. The following year, Skolem proved that the same was true of Peano arithmetic without addition, a system named Skolem arithmetic in his honor. Gödel's famous 1931 result is that Peano arithmetic itself (with both addition and multiplication) is incompletable and hence a posteriori undecidable.

Hao Wang praised Skolem's work as follows:
Skolem tends to treat general problems by concrete examples. He often seemed to present proofs in the same order as he came to discover them. This results in a fresh informality as well as a certain inconclusiveness. Many of his papers strike one as progress reports. Yet his ideas are often pregnant and potentially capable of wide application. He was very much a 'free spirit': he did not belong to any school, he did not found a school of his own, he did not usually make heavy use of known results... he was very much an innovator and most of his papers can be read and understood by those without much specialized knowledge. It seems quite likely that if he were young today, logic... would not have appealed to him. (Skolem 1970: 17-18)

For more on Skolem's accomplishments, see Hao Wang (1970).

See also

Leopold Löwenheim
Model theory
Skolem arithmetic
Skolem normal form
Skolem's paradox
Skolem problem
Skolem sequence
Skolem–Mahler–Lech theorem

References

Primary
 
Skolem, T. A., 1970. Selected works in logic, Fenstad, J. E., ed. Oslo: Scandinavian University Books. Contains 22 articles in German, 26 in English, 2 in French, 1 English translation of an article originally published in Norwegian, and a complete bibliography.

Writings in English translation

Jean van Heijenoort, 1967. From Frege to Gödel: A Source Book in Mathematical Logic, 1879–1931. Harvard Univ. Press.
1920. "Logico-combinatorial investigations on the satisfiability or provability of mathematical propositions: A simplified proof of a theorem by Löwenheim," 252–263.
1922. "Some remarks on axiomatized set theory," 290-301.
1923. "The foundations of elementary arithmetic," 302-33.
1928. "On mathematical logic," 508–524.

Secondary
Brady, Geraldine, 2000. From Peirce to Skolem. North Holland.
Fenstad, Jens Erik, 1970, "Thoralf Albert Skolem in Memoriam" in Skolem (1970: 9–16).
Hao Wang, 1970, "A survey of Skolem's work in logic" in Skolem (1970: 17–52).

External links
 
 
 Fenstad, Jens Erik, 1996, "Thoralf Albert Skolem 1887-1963: A Biographical Sketch," Nordic Journal of Philosophical Logic 1: 99-106.

1887 births
1963 deaths
Norwegian mathematicians
Mathematical logicians
Norwegian logicians
Lattice theorists
Set theorists
Model theorists
20th-century Norwegian philosophers